PDK International (also known as PDK or Phi Delta Kappa International) is a US professional organization for educators. Its main office is in Arlington, Virginia. It was founded on January 24, 1906.

Membership 
Currently, membership consists of educators and others interested in education.  Members are affiliated through one of several hundred chapters or directly to the international organization.

Governance 
PDK is governed by an International Board, who are elected by professional PDK members. The association abides by the Constitution and Bylaws of PDK International.

History 
Phi Delta Kappa began at Indiana University on January 24, 1906 in the formal creation of a chapter under the name Pi Kappa Mu. By 1910, the organization had a total of three chapters. On March 1, 1910, Pi Kappa Mu, Phi Delta Kappa (which had been organized at Columbia University on March 13, 1908) and Nu Rho Beta (which had been organized at University of Missouri on February 23, 1909) amalgamated under the name Phi Delta Kappa. Prior to amalgamation, Phi Delta Kappa had also branched out to include two other chapters.

Phi Delta Kappa was limited to white males at the August 1915 convention. In 1940, Sigma chapter at Ohio State University initiated two non-white members (one Chinese, one Black), and was suspended at the December 1941 convention with charter revocation to occur in May 1942 if the chapter did not remove membership for the two non-whites. A demand for a popular vote of the entire membership let to a membership poll being sent to all members and eventually the deletion of the "white clause" by the membership. On June 2, 1942 announcement was made to all of the chapters of the removal of the race restriction.

Phi Delta Kappa joined the Professional Interfraternity Conference in 1928.

Publications 
Phi Delta Kappan is a professional journal for education, published by Phi Delta Kappa International, since 1915.

Programs 
Programs administered by PDK include the honor society Pi Lambda Theta and the career and technical student organization Educators Rising

See also 

 Professional fraternities and sororities

References 

Educational organizations based in the United States
1906 establishments in Indiana
Student organizations established in 1906
Former members of Professional Fraternity Association